California University of Management and Sciences (CALUMS) is a private university in Anaheim, California. CALUMS was founded by David Park in 1998. CALUMS opened it Virginia Campus in Arlington, Virginia in 2008. The university offers graduate degrees in business administration, computer information systems, economics, healthcare management, and international business, and an undergraduate degree in business management.

CALUMS is accredited by the WASC Senior College and University Commission. It is also licensed to operate by the California Bureau for Private Postsecondary Education (BPPE).

Campus 

California University of Management and Sciences has two campuses. The university's main campus is the Anaheim Campus, located in Anaheim, California, and established in 1998. In 2008, the university established its second campus, the Virginia Campus in Fairfax, Virginia.

References

External links
 Official website

Universities and colleges in Orange County, California
Private universities and colleges in California